Brendon is a village in Devon, England, close to the border with Somerset within the Exmoor National Park. It is located just off the A39 and is on two long distance footpaths, the Coleridge Way and the Samaritans Way South West.

The village
The Church of St. Brendon was built in 1738, possibly using the stones from the original church at Cheriton. It lies midway between Cheriton and Brendon, about two miles (3 km) from each, and has a tower and four bells. The church was further restored in the nineteenth century and houses a Norman font. There is a sundial above the porch dated 1707.

The village is located just off the A39 and its population was 159 in 2001. The parish of Brendon is roughly square in shape and is defined by the East Lyn River to the north, the Hoaroak Water to the west and the Badgworthy Water to the east; a tributary of the latter, the Hoccombe Water defines part of its southern boundary. Brendon Common occupies a part of the moorland area which characterises the south of the parish. Badgeworthy Water is crossed by the 17th century packhorse Malmsmead Bridge.

History
The name contains two Old English place-name elements, the first – from brom – referring to the plant broom and the second – from dun – which tends to signify a fairly extensive and flat hill or upland expanse. It is recorded in the Domesday Book as Brandone. It is not connected with the Brendon Hills in Somerset, the name of which has a different origin.

White's Devonshire Directory (1850) describes Brendon as follows:
A small village 1½ miles SE of Lynton & 15 miles W of Minehead is in a picturesque valley of the river Lyn, has in its parish 271 souls & 6733 acres of land including Leeford hamlet & a large tract of moorland on the borders of Somersetshire where the rivers Exe, Lyn and Barle have their sources. F. W. Knight Esq. is the Lord of the mannor owner of most of the soil, and patron of the rectory ... valued in 1831 at £148. The Rev. T. Roe of Oare, Somerset is the incumbent, and has 57a, 2r, 22p, of glebe. The parsonage is a small cottage, and the church [St. Brendon] is an ancient structure with a tower and 4 bells.

Brendon is home to the Exmoor Folk Festival, and is both on the route of the Coleridge Way and the Samaritans Way South West.

Since 2012, Brendon has formed part of the civil parish of Brendon and Countisbury, having previously been a civil parish in its own right.

References

External links

 Brendon Valley

Villages in Devon
Former civil parishes in Devon
North Devon